Empire Bowman was a  cargo ship built in 1942 for the Ministry of War Transport (MoWT). One of her crew was awarded an Albert Medal for his actions in the sinking.

Description
The ship was built by C Connell & Co Ltd, Scotstoun. She was yard number 437. Launched on 4 April 1942, she was completed on 25 May 1942.

The engine was built by Barclay, Curle & Co Ltd, Glasgow.

Career

Empire Bowman's port of registry was Glasgow. She was operated under the management of Hain Steamship Co Ltd. Empire Bowman was a member of a number of convoys during the Second World War.

ON 99
Convoy ON 99 departed from Liverpool on 29 May 1942 and arrived at Boston on 12 June. Empire Bowman was in ballast for this voyage.

SL 126
Convoy SL 126 departed Freetown, Sierra Leone on 12 March 1943 and arrived at Liverpool on 1 April. Empire Bowman was on a voyage from Karachi, India to Hull via Mormugao, India; Durban, South Africa and Freetown. She was carrying a cargo which included 5,791 tons of general cargo and 2,500 tons of manganese ore. Four crew were killed; they are commemorated on the Tower Hill Memorial. Her Second Engineer, Gordon Love Bastian, rescued two stokers from the sinking ships' flooded engine room at great personal risk. For this act, he was awarded the Albert Medal on 17 August 1943, the citation read:

In 1971, all living holders of the Albert Medal and the Edward Medal were instructed to exchange their medal for the George Cross. Bastian thus became a recipient of the highest civilian award for gallantry in the United Kingdom.

Official Numbers and Code Letters

Official Numbers were a forerunner to IMO numbers. Empire Bowman had the UK official number 168714 and used the code letters BDWN.

References

1942 ships
Ships built on the River Clyde
Steamships of the United Kingdom
Merchant ships of the United Kingdom
Empire ships
Ministry of War Transport ships
Maritime incidents in March 1943
Ships sunk by German submarines in World War II
Shipwrecks in the Atlantic Ocean